Jan Lammers (Johannes Antonius Lammers, Zandvoort, 2 June 1956) is a racing driver from the Netherlands whose most notable claim to fame is victory in the 1988 Le Mans 24 Hours for Silk Cut Jaguar/TWR, next to a four-season spell in Formula One in 1979-1982, driving for Shadow, ATS, Ensign and Theodore. This was followed by a comeback with March for two races in 1992, after a world-record time gap of ten years.

Later in life, Lammers became a team owner as well, first setting up his own Formula Opel Lotus team, Vitaal Racing, winning the EFDA Opel Lotus Euroseries with Peter Kox in 1989, then creating the Racing for Holland outfit that raced in sportscars in 2001-2007. Between 2005 and 2009, he was the seatholder of the Dutch A1 Grand Prix team. During his Racing for Holland days, Lammers combined racing and management duties to win the 2002 and 2003 FIA Sportscar Championship.

One of the most versatile drivers in modern motor racing history, Lammers started in touring cars, to become the youngest Dutch champion in history in 1973 while repeating the act in 1976. He also raced in the European Renault 5 Turbo Cup, taking the 1983 and 1984 European titles. As a single-seater driver, his steps towards Formula One include securing the title in the 1978 European Formula 3 Championship. He remains the only Dutch driver to have done so. At the zenith of his career in Group C sports-prototypes, Lammers lifted the crown in the 1992 Japanese Sportscar Championship.

Lammers has also raced in Formula Ford, Formula 2, IndyCar, International F3000, Japanese F3000, the BTCC, BPR Global GT, FIA GT, the European Le Mans Series, IMSA, the American Le Mans Series, Grand-Am and the Dakar rally. Guest appearances include the Grand Prix Masters for retired F1 drivers, the BMW M1 Procar Series, the Dutch Supercar Challenge, the Dubai 24 Hours, the Gulf 12 Hours, the VW Scirocco R-Cup and the local Tulpenrallye.

Today, Lammers is best known as the figurehead for the revived Dutch Grand Prix.

Early career

Touring cars 

Born in Zandvoort, Lammers grows up washing cars at the nearby anti-skid school run by Dutch touring-car legend Rob Slotemaker. Encouraged by Slotemaker, the teenager nicknamed ‘Jantje’ (‘Little John’) starts to show customers how to safely skid cars. Having recognised his talent, Slotemaker sets him up in a Simca Rallye 2 for the 7,500-9,000 guilder Group 1 production class in the 1973 Dutch Touring Car Championship. At 16 years of age, young Lammers wins his first-ever car race and takes the title at his first go to become the youngest Dutch national champion in history.

Two more years in the Simca follow in a revised 8,000-10,000 guilder class, Lammers taking four more wins in 1974 but narrowly missing out on a title repeat. Wins elude him in 1975 but his name is already made. In 1976, he switches to an Opel Dealer Team Holland-run Opel Kadett GT/E to lift his second Dutch title.

Road to Formula One

Formula Ford 
Dovetailing his 1976 touring-car campaign with a first season in Formula Ford, Lammers quickly realises his future is in single-seaters. Driving a Crosslé in the Benelux, German and European Championship, the touring-car boy wonder surprises everyone by grabbing pole position at his first race, winning at the Jyllandring and Mengen and shining in the soaking wet finale of the Formula Ford Festival at Brands Hatch.

Formula 3 

Stepping up with Hawke to Formula 3 in 1977 proves to be a false dawn, as the Hawke proves no match for the Marches and the Ralts. For 1978, he switches to the Racing Team Holland outfit run by Alan Docking, with fellow future Formula 1 driver Huub Rothengatter and later Indy 500 winner Arie Luyendijk as his team mates. This is an inspired move as it leads to Lammers winning the 1978 European Formula 3 Championship after a close battle with Swede Anders Olofsson, while beating highly touted rivals such as Alain Prost, Nelson Piquet and Nigel Mansell. Lammers takes wins at Zandvoort, Magny-Cours, Karlskoga and in the famous Lotteria race at Monza to lift the crown. At the time, leading British magazine Autosport predicts: "He just has to be a World Champion of the eighties."

Formula 2 
Having received an offer from the works March Formula 2 team, Lammers decides to jump the category to go straight into Formula One with Shadow in 1979. He will make his single Formula 2 appearance in 1980, driving a March-BMW in his home race at Zandvoort, where he retires from third place.

Formula One 
Lammers spends four seasons in Formula One, racing largely uncompetitive machinery and failing to score a World Championship point in any of his 41 appearances. His talent is universally recognised, though, and the Dutchman only narrowly misses out on the chance to join Ferrari in 1982 as a replacement of Gilles Villeneuve who was killed at Zolder earlier in the year. The drive goes to Patrick Tambay instead.

In 1979, Lammers and fellow rookie Elio De Angelis join Shadow, but the team led by American Don Nichols is in its death throes, and the pair fail to make an impact. Lammers’ best result is a ninth place in the Canadian GP. Both are invited by Colin Chapman to test for Lotus, with De Angelis getting the job for 1980, as Lammers is unwilling to wait for Chapman’s decision. Instead, he decides to sign for the German-owned ATS team.

The underfunded outfit hands Lammers the old D3 car while team leader Marc Surer debuts with the new D4, but when Surer breaks his legs in an accident, Lammers gets his hands on the new D4. He immediately qualifies fourth on the grid at Long Beach but the car breaks on the opening lap of the race. This would remain the highpoint of his F1 career. Other notable ATS performances include battling Jody Scheckter’s Ferrari at Zolder, and retiring from a points-scoring position at Jarama. When Surer makes a return to ATS, Lammers is forced to jump ship to Ensign. In contrasting fortunes, his former teammate De Angelis has a fine season at Lotus while Lammers fails to qualify the cumbersome Ensign on several occasions.

For 1981, Lammers is invited for a test to become Nelson Piquet’s teammate at Brabham, but team principal Bernie Ecclestone chooses to go with Mexican pay driver Hector Rebaque. Instead, Lammers rejoins ATS and shines in the controversial non-championship South African GP at Kyalami where he fights De Angelis for second place until he is hit by brake problems. When Swede Slim Borgudd arrives with healthy funding from pop band ABBA, Lammers has to move over. 

In 1982, Lammers switches to Theodore but the underfunded team fails to hand him the opportunity to shine. At Monaco, Lammers’ TY02 has to stay on nude rims for a day because the team doesn't get any tyres. Still seen as a natural talent, he is asked by Renault to replace the injured Prost at Detroit, only for the championship leader to recover in time. Lammers steps back into the Theodore but before the start of the first session he is approached by Ferrari to replace Gilles Villeneuve from Zandvoort on. In a twist of fate, the Theodore’s throttle sticks during the session and Lammers hits the wall to break his thumb. As a result, Patrick Tambay signs the Ferrari contract. At Zandvoort, instead of driving the Ferrari, Lammers takes part in his last Grand Prix before Tommy Byrne takes over the seat.

Late 1985, Lammers is given a test by Toleman at Estoril but with the team unable to get a tyre contract for 1986, plans for a Formula One return fall through. In 1989, another Formula One opportunity comes to nothing when Lammers is asked by Ken Tyrrell to replace Michele Alboreto, but the Dutchman decides to stick with TWR Jaguar, and Tyrrell signs up Jean Alesi instead.

Then in 1992, Lammers makes a surprise Formula One comeback when he steps in at March for the final two races of the season – a full ten years after his initial final Grand Prix, a record career gap in Formula One. Replacing Karl Wendlinger, Lammers laps sixth fastest in wet free practice at Suzuka, before retiring from the race with a broken gearbox. At Adelaide, he finishes 12th. Looking set to continue with March in 1993, his Formula One ambitions receive a blow when the team is denied an engine deal by Ilmor unless bills are paid. This leaves Lammers a spectator at Kyalami, after which the team folds.

Another Formula One option hits the rocks when Lammers is signed by the DAMS F3000 team for its debut season in 1996, having already tested their GD-01 car all through 1995. The project remains stillborn when DAMS fails to gather sufficient funding.

Sportscars 
Fed up with driving inferior machines at the back of the Formula One grid, Lammers decides to switch to sportscar racing where he becomes a mainstay for the next three decades, both as a driver and a team owner. His time in Group C includes seasons with Richard Lloyd Racing’s private Porsche 956, the works Jaguar team and the works Toyota team, while in the days of LMP900 and LMP1, Lammers runs his own Racing for Holland team with the Japanese Dome S101 chassis. His final call at Le Mans comes in 2017 and 2018 when he races the Racing Team Nederland Dallara in LMP2, sharing with Rubens Barrichello and Jumbo Supermarkets CEO and team owner Frits van Eerd.

Prototypes 
Having turned his back on Formula One, Lammers starts his World Sportscar Championship career in 1983 by joining top Porsche privateer Richard Lloyd Racing, taking several podium finishes with Thierry Boutsen, Keke Rosberg and Jonathan Palmer, while finishing sixth on his Le Mans debut. In 1984, he is paired with Palmer, and the Canon-liveried 956 takes victory over the works cars at Brands Hatch. The two add podiums at Monza, the Nürburgring, Sandown Park and Imola, and retire from Le Mans in a winning position.

A mid-season switch sees Lammers snapped up by Tom Walkinshaw at TWR Jaguar, and on his debut for the team at a very hot Shah Alam in Malaysia he brings home the Jag in second place. Meanwhile, he makes his IMSA GTP debut racing a March-Buick at Miami with Roberto Guerrero. In the 1986 Daytona 24 Hours, driving the BF Goodrich Porsche 962, he is heading for victory when his brakes fail, leading to a sizeable crash that he is lucky to escape from. Later in the season, when his promising IndyCar adventure collapses with the disappointing Eagle, Walkinshaw is quick to lure Lammers back to TWR. The Dutchman is immediately competitive with second at Spa and third at Jerez, before racing for Nissan at Watkins Glen in IMSA GTP.

In 1987, Lammers joins TWR Jaguar – now sponsored by Silk Cut – as a proper works driver, and is teamed with Grand Prix veteran John Watson. They win at Jarama, Monza and Fuji and take podiums at Silverstone, Brands Hatch and Spa. At Le Mans, third driver Win Percy crashes their car out of the race. Team orders mean that they finish second in the championship.

1988 would become Lammers’ most successful season in Group C racing. Now paired with ex-Lotus Formula One driver Johnny Dumfries, the two finish second at Spa and third at Brno, before being joined by Andy Wallace at the Le Mans 24 Hours. Lammers drives for 13 hours to be the anchor in a popular win for TWR Jaguar, the first for the marque since 1957. For this, he is congratulated by Queen Elizabeth II and rewarded with the title of Honorary Member of the BRDC. In IMSA, Lammers is part of the crew that wins the Daytona 24 Hours, after he is moved over from his retired car to join Martin Brundle, Raul Boesel and John Nielsen in the lead Jaguar entry, winning the race. With regular teammate Davy Jones, Lammers wins at Del Mar and ends up on the podium at West Palm Beach, Lime Rock, Mid-Ohio and Sears Point.

In 1989, the Jaguars were outclassed by the resurgent Mercedes effort, with Lammers only managing to score a second place at Jarama with Patrick Tambay. In the US, Lammers is more successful, winning in Portland and Del Mar, taking second in the Daytona 24 Hours, Lime Rock, Mid-Ohio and Road America and third at Sears Point and Topeka. The following year, Lammers wins the Daytona 24 Hours again, this time paired with Andy Wallace and Davy Jones, before taking third in the Sebring 12 Hours. In the WSC, however, Jaguar’s new turbo engine proves fast but unreliable, and together with Wallace, Lammers only picks up a pair of second places. Switching to the proven atmospheric V12 for Le Mans, Jaguar takes the double, but Lammers is in the second Jaguar across the line, having to recover from an earlier crash by teammate Franz Konrad.

Having opted for a switch to Toyota, Lammers decides to wait in the wings for the new programme to come alive in 1992. In the World Championship, mated with Geoff Lees, Lammers takes two podium finishes, second at Suzuka and third at Magny-Cours. In the Japanese Sports-Prototype Championship, however, two wins at Fuji and Mine add up to another title for the Dutchman. One more Toyota appearance follows in 1993, finishing sixth for the Japanese constructor in the Le Mans 24 Hours.

In 1995, Lammers returns to IMSA to compete at Daytona and Sebring in the Auto Toy Store Spice-Chevrolet SE90. With Andy Wallace, he wins the Sebring 12 Hours on the road but a timekeeping error declares the Fermín Velez/Andy Evans/Eric van de Poele Ferrari 333SP as the winner, while as a guest driver, Lammers joins Derek Warwick and Mario Andretti in a Courage-Porsche C36 to finish sixth in the 1996 Le Mans 24 Hours.

In 1999 and 2000, Lammers returns to prototype racing, as Konrad Motorsport moves up to the LMP class with a Ford-engined Lola B98/10, followed by a B2K/10, while in the US he joins J&P Motorsports to race a Panoz LMP-1 Roadster-S. In the meantime, he progresses with setting up his own team for 2001. At Konrad, teaming up with countrymen Tom Coronel and Peter Kox serves as a prequel to that.

Lammers embarks on a new era of sportscar success in 2001 when he rekindles his ties with Japanese manufacturer Dome to race their Judd-engined S101, entering it in the new FIA Sportscar Championship and the Le Mans 24 Hours with young Dutch-born but Belgian-licensed Val Hillebrand as his teammate. For Le Mans, the Dutchman offers small segments of bodywork to small, private sponsors, giving the car the look of a driving chequered flag. A contribution of 2200 euros is enough to become a Racing for Holland sponsor. Lammers and Hillebrand dominate the final round of the championship before going into the new season as clear favourites, while placing themselves amongst the Audis at Le Mans. With three wins and five podiums Lammers and Hillebrand indeed take the 2002 title in the leading SR1 class, before doubling up in 2003, again with three wins and five podiums. Meanwhile in 2002, Lammers races the Crawford SSC2K at Daytona and joins Champion for Sebring to take third in their Audi R8.

When the FIA Sportscar Championship collapses after 2003, the Dome continues at Le Mans, where Lammers takes seventh in 2004 along with Elton Julian and countryman John Bosch, the trio copying the result in 2005. In the meantime, the Dutchman guests at Doran-Lista to take fourth in the 2004 Daytona 24 Hours and with Dyson Racing at Sebring and the Petit Le Mans, finishing third in the latter. In the 2005 Daytona 24 Hours, Lammers steps into the Howard-Boss Motorsports Crawford DP03 to claim another US podium with third. Rejoining them for 2006, their second cooperation gains no results.

With the start of the Le Mans Series in 2005, Racing for Holland signs up for assorted rounds in 2005, 2006 and 2007, but by now the Dome is outclassed by the more recent LMP1 designs. After he shuts down the team while continuing to pay off its debts well into the next decade, Lammers returns as a gun for hire in 2008. In an LMP2 season dominated by Jos Verstappen and the Van Merksteijn Porsche RS Spyder, Lammers teams up with the Swiss Horag-Lista team’s RS Spyder to finish the year fourth in class, along with teammate Didier Theys. At Le Mans in 2008, he joins Greg Pickett and Klaus Graf in the Charouz Racing System Lola-Judd B07/17, but the car fails to finish.

Having gone into semi-retirement from 2010, Lammers hooks up with Hope Racing to race the experimental SwissHyTech Hybrid-engined ORECA 01, and does one 2016 Le Mans Cup round in the Racing Team Holland Ligier-Nissan JSP3, but waits until 2017 for his final foray in top-level prototype racing, signing up for a three-year spell with Racing Team Nederland, the team funded by Dutch supermarket mogul Frits van Eerd. Racing their Dallara-Gibson P217 in the LMP2 class of the European Le Mans Series, Lammers and Van Eerd claim a seventh and eighth as their best results in a full 2017 ELMS season. In 2018 and 2019, Lammers acts as third driver to Van Eerd and Giedo van der Garde at Le Mans before closing the curtain on his active career.

GTs 
On the back of the failed DAMS Formula One project, Lammers joins the Lotus Racing outfit for BPR Global GT in 1996. The GTI team is headed by countryman Toine Hezemans along with Ian Foley and George Howard-Chappell and runs a pair of Lotus Esprit V8s in the GT1 category. Teamed with Alex Portman, Perry McCarthy, Chris Goodwin, Andy Wallace, Fabien Giroix and Mike Hezemans, he claims pole at the Nürburgring and takes second at Silverstone, but apart from that the car proves very unreliable. In 1997, its Lotus Elise GT1 successor is outclassed by McLaren-BMW and Mercedes in the inaugural FIA GT Championship. After the Lotus takeover by Proton, the GT1 programme is quickly canned.

In 1998, Lammers races the Bitter GT1 for Team Hezemans before switching to GT2 with Roock Racing and Konrad Motorsport, while helping to develop Nissan’s new R390 GT1 car. At Le Mans, he joins Erik Comas and Andrea Montermini to finish sixth, as the Nissans get beaten by Porsche’s 911 GT1. Late in the season, Lammers returns to Konrad to share a 911 GT2 with Franz Konrad in the Petit Le Mans, followed by a win at Laguna Seca.

Following a five-year GT break, the Dutchman teams up with Prodrive to drive their Ferrari 550 Maranello in the 2003 Petit Le Mans, finishing fourth in the GTS class, and then in 2008, having closed down his own team, Lammers makes a few guest appearances in GT racing, driving the Spa 24 Hours in the Lamborghini Murciélago R-GT for the IPB-Spartak team. Meanwhile, he does a full season of ADAC GT sharing Reiter Engineering’s Lamborghini Gallardo GT3 with countryman Marius Ritskes, with three second places as his best results. Continuing in 2009 under the Racing Team Holland banner (not to be confused with Racing for Holland), the duo fails to score any more points. A one-off at Spa in the team’s GT4 Ford Mustang FR500C fails to materialise.

Another single GT4 appearance takes place in 2016 with a Ginetta G55 GT4 drive in the Paul Ricard 24 Hours for Team Africa Le Mans. His final two GT races come at his farewell weekend at Le Mans in 2019, sharing a Bentley Continental GT3 with Greg Mills for the same Team Africa Le Mans.

Other championships

IndyCar 
In 1985, Lammers grabs the opportunity to make his IndyCar debut, taking a drive with the small AMI Racing team. His strong performance in their March-Cosworth 85C allows him to be snapped up by the Forsythe-Green team, racing their Lola-Cosworth T800 and T900 in the final three races of the season, The Dutchman immediately scores points for them with fifth at Laguna Seca. At Miami, Lammers challenges Danny Sullivan for victory before making a mistake towards the end. This leads to Dan Gurney’s All-American Racers signing Lammers as their lead driver for the 1986 season, but that year’s Eagle GC86 proves uncompetitive and Gurney withdraws the team ahead of the Indianapolis 500. Taking over the Machinists Union GC86 for three races later in the season leads to an eighth at Laguna Seca and ninth at Miami.

F3000 
1986 is a season that proves Lammers’ ultimate versatility, as he races in IndyCars, the WSC and Formula 3 while also taking up on an offer from Eddie Jordan Racing to replace Russell Spence in the team’s March-Cosworth 86B. His single appearance at the Le Mans-Bugatti circuit results in an 11th-place finish.

In 1991, while waiting for Toyota’s new sportscar programme to come on song, Lammers is in Japan to help Dome with the development of the Mugen-engined F102, their new F3000 car. Rewarded with a one-off race outing at Suzuka, he takes third in his single appearance in the All-Nippon F3000 Championship.

More F3000 follows in 1993 after his Formula One deal with March fails to materialise. Accepting an offer to join the Italian Il Barone Rampante team to follow in the footsteps of Rubens Barrichello, Lammers takes fourth at Enna as his best result before the team is forced to close shop before the end of the season.

Two years later, Lammers is back in F3000 as he joins the Vortex team owned by Dutch transport magnate Henny Vollenberg. He wins the F3000 South African GP at Kyalami, beating Kenny Bräck and teammate Tarso Marques, and does three more European rounds before quitting the team when key staff decide to leave.

Macau GP 
Making a surprise return to Formula 3, Lammers joins the Macau GP grid in 1985, racing a Ralt-Volkswagen RT30 for Intersport Racing. He embarrasses many of the regulars by qualifying and finishing third. In 1986, he repeats the trick with Murray Taylor Racing’s similar Ralt, again finishing third. Returning to Intersport in 1987, Lammers goes one better to take second place in their Ralt-Toyota RT31, storming up from 11th on the grid, while his final Macau appearance comes in 1988, again with Intersport. This time, he hauls his Ralt-Toyota RT32 up to sixth from 17th on the grid.

BTCC 
After his less successful 1993 season, Lammers makes a surprise move to join the touring car trail during the BTCC’s burgeoning Super Touring era. Teaming with his old friends from TWR, he becomes teammate to Rickard Rydell in a pair of Volvo 850 SE cars. With its estate shape, the 850 SE is a crowd puller but it lacks ultimate pace and Lammers finishes no higher than fifth.

One-make series

BMW Procar 
In 1980, during his time at ATS and Ensign, Lammers takes part in the second season of the BMW M1 Procar Series that is run on Grand Prix weekends, with several Grand Prix drivers such as Jones, Lauda, Pironi and Piquet being part of the show. Lammers wins the opening race at Donington Park, finishes second at Avus and the Norisring, starts from pole position at Monaco and is the title favourite until Hans-Joachim Stuck drives him off the track at Imola.

Renault 5 Turbo Cup 
In his final Formula One season, Lammers becomes a regular in the European Renault 5 Turbo Cup, representing Renault Netherlands and taking home one win. He continues in the series in 1983 to take four wins and the championship, and repeats the trick in even more dominant fashion in 1984, lifting eight victories on his way to the title.

Grand Prix Masters 
In 2005 and 2006, the Grand Prix Masters are set up as a one-make motor racing series featuring retired Formula One drivers. Lammers takes part in the sole event of 2005, finishing ninth at Kyalami, and also races in both 2006 events, taking seventh at Losail and retiring from the race at Silverstone.

VW Scirocco R-Cup 
Having already retired as a full-time professional driver, Lammers guests in four races across three seasons (2010, 2011 and 2013) of the VW Scirocco R-Cup, with ninth in the 2013 Hockenheim round as his best result.

Other appearances

Rallies 

As further proof of his versatility, Lammers adds the Dutch Tulpenrallye to his portfolio in 1979, driving for the Opel Dealer Team. Over two decades later, he is invited to join Frits van Eerd’s new Dakar Rally enterprise in 2010. In the first of five Dakar outings in the Ginaf X2222 4x4 truck, Lammers fails to finish, before returning in the Ginaf works team in 2011, finishing 19th, and three more years with his own Ginaf-supported team, with 25th place in 2013 as his best result. In 2012, Lammers revives the chequered Racing for Holland livery for a sponsorship concept similar to the one he explored in the previous decade.

Team principal 
Next to his career as a professional racing driver, Lammers has acted as the team principal of his own team on three very different occasions.

Vitaal Racing 
Between 1989 and 1991, Lammers runs his Opel Dealerteam Holland-supported Vitaal Racing outfit in Formula Opel Lotus. In his first year, he joins forces with Marlboro Challenge winner Peter Kox, and together they win the EFDA Opel Lotus Euroseries as well as the Benelux series. In 1990, Lammers takes on another Marlboro Challenge winner, as Marcel Albers is promoted from Formula Ford, resulting in sixth in the final European standings.

Racing for Holland 
Setting up Racing for Holland at the start of the 21st century proves to be the birth of Lammers’ final period of sportscar success at the highest level. With their Dome-Judd S101, Racing for Holland takes two consecutive titles in the FIA Sportscar Championship in 2002 and 2003 and continues with the Dome until 2007. Lammers later revives the Racing for Holland moniker – and a similar sponsorship scheme – for three of his Dakar outings in the following decade.

A1GP 
Not known as Racing for Holland as such, the team is the seatholder for the Netherlands in the A1 Grand Prix series that runs between 2005 and 2009. Lammers starts off with Jos Verstappen as his driver, who takes victory at Durban in the opening 2005-’06 season, while Jeroen Bleekemolen acts as the team’s reserve driver. Bleekemolen steps up into the leading role for in 2006-’07, winning the Beijing street race, as Renger van der Zande takes his place as a backup driver, himself taking part in three races. Bleekemolen continues in 2007-’08, now supported by Arie Luyendyk Jr. Ditching its cheap Avon-shod Lola-Zytek chassis for pukka Michelin-tyred Ferrari cars, the A1GP organisation hurry into bankruptcy in a final 2008-‘09 season in which Robert Doornbos and Jeroen Bleekemolen take turns at the wheel, each winning a sprint race on their way to fourth for the Netherlands in the final standings.

New responsibilities

Dutch GP 
After his decision to go into full retirement after the 2019 season, Lammers quickly assumes another duty, as he steps in to become sporting director of the organisation founded to revive the Dutch GP at Zandvoort. Starting in 2020, Lammers is more than just an ambassador for the event, and after a Covid-induced postponement in 2020, the Dutch dream is finally realised in 2021, when the first Dutch GP since 1985 is staged.

Personal life 
Lammers has two children from his marriage with Fardous Hashem. His daughter Sumaya is 27 years old, his son Rayan is 25.

Currently, Lammers is in a relationship since 2001 with Mariska Hoyinck. Together they have a son, René.

Lammers’ youngest son René Lammers is currently competing in karts. The 14-year-old is a frontrunner in the FIA European Karting Championship, having won both the WSK Super Masters Series and WSK Champions Cup in 2021 as well as the WSK Euro Series in 2020 in the 60 Mini category. Young Lammers is also a two-time winner of the Trofeo Andrea Margutti.

Racing record

Complete Formula One World Championship results
(key)

Complete World Sportscar Championship results
(key) (Races in bold indicate pole position) (Races in italics indicate fastest lap)

Footnotes

24 Hours of Le Mans results

24 Hours of Daytona
(key)

PPG Indycar Series
(key)

Indianapolis 500

Complete European Formula Two Championship results
(key)

Complete International Formula 3000 results
(key)

Complete Japanese Formula 3000 Championship results
(key)

Complete British Touring Car Championship results
(key) (Races in bold indicate pole position) (Races in italics indicate fastest lap)

Complete FIA GT Championship results
(key)

Complete European Le Mans Series results
(key)

Complete Grand Prix Masters results
(key) Races in bold indicate pole position, races in italics indicate fastest lap.

Complete FIA World Endurance Championship results
(key)

Books 
 Klis, Hans van der (2007, 3rd ed.), Dwars door de Tarzanbocht: de dertien Nederlandse Formule 1-coureurs. Amsterdam, pp. 98–115, .
 Koense, Mark (2020). Jan Lammers, De biografie van een leven met 300 km/h. Amgini Autosport Store, 2020, no ISBN.

References

External links
 
 
 Jan Lammers on Twitter
 Jan Lammers as a speaker

1956 births
Living people
People from Zandvoort
Dutch racing drivers
Dutch Formula One drivers
Shadow Formula One drivers
ATS Wheels Formula One drivers
Ensign Formula One drivers
Theodore Formula One drivers
March Formula One drivers
Champ Car drivers
Japanese Formula 3000 Championship drivers
A1 Grand Prix team owners
German Formula Three Championship drivers
FIA European Formula 3 Championship drivers
British Touring Car Championship drivers
24 Hours of Le Mans drivers
24 Hours of Le Mans winning drivers
Grand Prix Masters drivers
International Formula 3000 drivers
Dakar Rally drivers
24 Hours of Daytona drivers
American Le Mans Series drivers
European Le Mans Series drivers
World Sportscar Championship drivers
ADAC GT Masters drivers
24 Hours of Spa drivers
FIA World Endurance Championship drivers
24H Series drivers
Sports car racing team owners
Sportspeople from North Holland
Jaguar in motorsport
IMSA GT Championship drivers
Japanese Sportscar Championship drivers
TOM'S drivers
Charouz Racing System drivers
Forsythe Racing drivers
Team LeMans drivers
Racing Team Nederland drivers
Nismo drivers
Jaguar Racing drivers
Morand Racing drivers
Target Racing drivers
Le Mans Cup drivers